Sabri Çakır (born 1955 in Denizli, Turkey) is a poet. He moved to West Germany in 1978, joining family members who had moved to the area earlier. He has also been a teacher of Turkish children in Gelsenkirchen. Çakır has published poems in both German and Turkish magazines. In 1984 an entire collection of his poetry was published in Turkey.

References

1955 births
German people of Turkish descent
20th-century German poets
Living people
German male poets
20th-century German male writers